Granite is a type of rock.

Granite may also refer to:

Places

Australia
 Granite Island (South Australia)

United States
 Granite, Colorado
 Granite City, Illinois
 Granite, Iowa
 Granite, Maryland
 Granite Falls, Minnesota
 Granite, Oklahoma
 Granite, Utah
 Granite, Wyoming
 Granite State, the official nickname of New Hampshire
 Granite Peak, any one of 43 peaks by that name
 Granite Bay, California

Canada
 Granite Peak, either of two peaks by that name in British Columbia

People
Zack Granite, a professional baseball player

Other uses
 Granite (Northern Rock vehicle), a financial instrument
 "Granite" (song), a song by the drum and bass band Pendulum
 The Granite, college yearbook of the University of New Hampshire
 Granite Construction, a California-based heavy civil general contractor and construction material producer
 Granite Broadcasting Corporation
 GMC Granite, a concept car

See also
 Granite Falls (disambiguation)
 Granite Lake (disambiguation)
 Granit (disambiguation)
The Granites (disambiguation)